Sir John Potter (10 April 1815 – 25 October 1858) was a Liberal Party politician in the United Kingdom.

Early life 
John was born in April 1815 at Polefield near Prestwich, Lancashire. He was the elder son of Sir Thomas Potter and his second wife, Esther née Bayley. His father was involved in business and politics in the rapidly developing town of Manchester, and was named as the borough's first mayor when it was granted a charter of incorporation.

John grew up on the family estate at Buile Hill, Pendleton after its completion in 1827. He was educated at the University of Edinburgh.

Political career 
Potter took no part in public life until the death of his father in March 1845. He was given his father's aldermanic seat on Manchester Town Council and made a justice of the peace for the borough. He elected to serve as Mayor of Manchester in 1848, serving three terms until 1851. During the visit of Queen Victoria to Manchester he was invested as a knight bachelor on 10 October 1851. In the same year he was made deputy lieutenant of the County Palatine of Lancaster. During his term of office, the Free Library was founded—an institution to which he made several donations. In politics he was stated to be an "Advanced Liberal" in favour of the widening of the electoral franchise. He was a member of the Portico Library and continued to be a member of Manchester Town Council until his death. He was the head of Potter, Morris & Company, a large firm of Manchester merchants.

The greatest of his many contributions to Manchester was the founding of its Free Library.

Queen Victoria visited Manchester in 1851 and during the course of that visit she conferred on him the honour of a knighthood on 10 October 1851.

At the 1857 general election, he was elected as one two members of parliament (MPs) for Manchester. However, he suffered from ill health from the time he entered parliament, and declared his intention to resign his seat.

Death 
Sir John died in office on 25 October 1858 at the age of 43 at Beech House, Eccles. He was buried at Ardwick Cemetery, Manchester.

References

External links 
 

1815 births
1858 deaths
Liberal Party (UK) MPs for English constituencies
UK MPs 1857–1859
Mayors of Manchester
Alumni of the University of Edinburgh
Knights Bachelor
Politicians awarded knighthoods
Deputy Lieutenants of Lancashire
John
Members of the Parliament of the United Kingdom for Manchester